The 1969 Furman Paladins football team was an American football team that represented Furman University as a member of the Southern Conference (SoCon) during the 1969 NCAA University Division football season. In their twelfth season under head coach Bob King, Furman compiled a 1–8–1 record, with a mark of 0–4 in conference play, placing tied for sixth in the SoCon.

Schedule

References

Furman
Furman Paladins football seasons
Furman Paladins football